Adam Ginning (born 13 January 2000) is a Swedish professional ice hockey defenceman who currently plays with the Lehigh Valley Phantoms in the American Hockey League (AHL) as a prospect under contract to the Philadelphia Flyers of the National Hockey League (NHL). He was selected by the Flyers in the second round, 50th overall, of the 2018 NHL Entry Draft.

Playing career
Ginning played as a youth within Linköping HC junior program.

Ginning played his first four professional seasons with Linköping HC before his contract expired and was not extended following the 2019–20 season. On 6 May 2020, Ginning as a free agent agreed to an initial one-year contract with fellow SHL club, Färjestad BK.

Having claimed the Swedish Championship with Färjestad BK in the 2021–22 season, Ginning was signed to a two-year, entry-level contract with the Philadelphia Flyers on 18 May 2022.

Career statistics

Regular season and playoffs

International

Awards and honors

References

External links

2000 births
Living people
Färjestad BK players
Lehigh Valley Phantoms players
Linköping HC players
Philadelphia Flyers draft picks
Sportspeople from Linköping
Swedish ice hockey defencemen
HC Vita Hästen players